The 1918 Spanish general election was held on Sunday, 24 February and on Sunday, 10 March 1918, to elect the 17th Restoration Cortes of the Kingdom of Spain. All 409 seats in the Congress of Deputies were up for election, as well as 180 of 360 seats in the Senate.

Overview

Background

Electoral system
The Spanish Cortes were envisaged as "co-legislative bodies", based on a nearly perfect bicameralism. Both the Congress of Deputies and the Senate had legislative, control and budgetary functions, sharing equal powers except for laws on contributions or public credit, where the Congress had preeminence. Voting for the Cortes was on the basis of universal manhood suffrage, which comprised all national males over twenty-five, having at least a two-year residency in a municipality and in full enjoyment of their civil rights. Voting was compulsory except for those older than 70, the clergy, first instance judges and public notaries.

For the Congress of Deputies, 173 seats were elected using a partial block voting in 44 multi-member constituencies, with the remaining 236 being elected under a one-round first-past-the-post system in single-member districts. Candidates winning a plurality in each constituency were elected. In constituencies electing ten seats or more, electors could vote for no more than four candidates less than the number of seats to be allocated; in those with more than eight seats and up to ten, for no more than three less; in those with more than four seats and up to eight, for no more than two less; in those with more than one seat and up to four, for no more than one less; and for one candidate in single-member districts. Additionally, in single-member districts where candidates ran unopposed, as well as in multi-member districts where the number of candidates was equal or less than the number of seats to be filled, candidates were to be automatically proclaimed without an election. The Congress was entitled to one member per each 50,000 inhabitants, with each multi-member constituency being allocated a fixed number of seats: 13 for Barcelona and Madrid, 6 for Valencia, 5 for La Coruña, Palma, Santander and Seville, 4 for Alicante, Almería, Badajoz, Córdoba, Huelva, Jaén, Lugo, Málaga, Murcia and Oviedo and 3 for Alcázar de San Juan, Alcoy, Algeciras, Bilbao, Burgos, Cádiz, Cartagena, Castellón de la Plana, Ciudad Real, El Ferrol, Gijón, Granada, Jerez de la Frontera, Las Palmas, Lérida, Llerena, Lorca, Orense, Pamplona, Pontevedra, San Sebastián, Santa Cruz de Tenerife, Tarragona, Valladolid, Vera, Vigo and Zaragoza. The law also provided for by-elections to fill seats vacated throughout the legislature.

For the Senate, 180 seats were indirectly elected, with electors voting for delegates instead of senators. Elected delegates—equivalent in number to one-sixth of the councillors in each municipal corporation—would then vote for senators using a write-in, two-round majority voting system. The provinces of Barcelona, Madrid and Valencia were allocated four seats each, whereas each of the remaining provinces was allocated three seats, for a total of 150. The remaining 30 were allocated to a number of institutions, electing one seat each—the Archdioceses of Burgos, Granada, Santiago de Compostela, Seville, Tarragona, Toledo, Valencia, Valladolid and Zaragoza; the Royal Spanish Academy; the Royal Academies of History, Fine Arts, Sciences, Moral and Political Sciences and Medicine; the Universities of Madrid, Barcelona, Granada, Oviedo, Salamanca, Santiago, Seville, Valencia, Valladolid and Zaragoza; and the Economic Societies of Friends of the Country from Madrid, Barcelona, León, Seville and Valencia. An additional 180 seats comprised senators in their own right—the Monarch's offspring and the heir apparent once coming of age; Grandees of Spain of the first class; Captain Generals of the Army and the Navy Admiral; the Patriarch of the Indies and archbishops; as well as other high-ranking state figures—and senators for life (who were appointed by the Monarch).

Election date
The term of each House of the Cortes—the Congress and one-half of the elective part of the Senate—expired five years from the date of their previous election, unless they were dissolved earlier. The Monarch had the prerogative to dissolve both Houses at any given time—either jointly or separately—and call a snap election.

Results

Congress of Deputies

Bibliography

References

External links
Historical archive of deputies (1810–1977) from www.congreso.es, the official Congress of Deputies web portal (in Spanish)
Elections in the Sexenio Revolucionario and the Restoration at www.historiaelectoral.com (in Spanish/Catalan)

1918 elections in Spain
1918 in Spain
1918
February 1918 events